Gallong, or more commonly Galo, may refer to:

 Galo people of Arunachal Pradesh, Northeast India
 Galo language, the Tibeto-Burman language spoken by them

Galong may refer to:
 Galong, New South Wales, a town in New South Wales, Australia
 Galong railway station, a closed railway station once serving the town